"Another One Rides the Bus" is a 1981 parody of Queen's "Another One Bites the Dust" by American comedy musician "Weird Al" Yankovic. The song describes a person riding in a crowded public bus. It was recorded live on September 14, 1980, on the Dr. Demento Show, hosted by Barret "Dr. Demento" Hansen. Accompanying Yankovic was Jon "Bermuda" Schwartz, who would go on to be the parody artist's long-time drummer.

The song became a hit on the Dr. Demento Show as well as an underground success. Hoping to capitalize on the success of the song, Yankovic originally released "Another One Rides the Bus" on an EP of the same name. Later, the song was issued as a commercial single by TK Records, which peaked at number 4 on the U.S. Billboard Bubbling Under Hot 100 Singles. However, it quickly fell off the chart when TK subsequently closed. In 1983, Yankovic re-released the song on his debut album. The song has been well received by critics, and Brian Maythe guitarist of Queenhas expressed his amusement with Yankovic's parody.

Background

In 1979, while he was still a student at California Polytechnic State University (Cal Poly) in San Luis Obispo, California, Alfred "Weird Al" Yankovic recorded a rough parody of "My Sharona" by The Knack entitled "My Bologna". Fortuitous circumstances led to the song being released by Capitol Records on December 25, 1979. Although the single managed to sell 10,000 copies a month after its release, Yankovic soon learned that Capitol had no interest in promoting the record or releasing a follow-up single. After graduating in 1980 with a Bachelor of Science degree in architecture, Yankovic still had an interest in releasing parody music, and soon turned his attention to "Another One Bites the Dust" by rock band Queen. The song had been written by Queen bassist John Deacon and released on their 1980 album The Game.

According to Yankovic in discussing his 2022 satirical film Weird: The Al Yankovic Story, part of the agreement with Queen to use "Another One Bites the Dust" was that Yankovic was prevented from mentioning or showing Freddie Mercury in his works. Yankovic had wanted to include an actor in a cameo role of Mercury in the film, but instead cast David Dastmalchian as Deacon.

Writing and recording

Lyrically, "Another One Rides the Bus" describes a person riding in a crowded public bus. In the first verse, the bus proceeds to pick up more people. The second verse discusses the various things that are touching the person (such as a suitcase and an elbow), and about how several of his personal items are missing (like a contact lens and a wallet). In the third verse, the speaker is trying to get fresh air but the bus's fan is broken and his window does not open. This causes him to exclaim that he "hasn't been in a crowd like this since [he] went to see The Who." Finally, he laments about not getting off the bus sooner.

Yankovic debuted the song live on September 14, 1980, on the Dr. Demento Show, hosted by Barret "Dr. Demento" Hansen. While practicing the song outside the sound booth, Yankovic met Jon "Bermuda" Schwartz, who offered to provide percussion for his performance. Because Yankovic did not have a drum kit, Schwartz rhythmically struck Yankovic's accordion case as a way of keeping the beat. The version of "Another One Rides the Bus" that was recorded in 1980 and released in 1981 was later re-released in its original form on Yankovic's eponymous debut album (1983).

The single's b-side is "Gotta Boogie", which was co-written by Joe Earley. The song is a play on words discussing a man with a "boogie" on his finger and his failure to get rid of it. The version of "Gotta Boogie" included on this single was recorded in April 1980; this song also appeared on Yankovic's eponymous debut album, although in a re-recorded form.

Release

Much like "My Bologna", "Another One Rides the Bus" was a hit on the Dr. Demento Show, and Dr. Demento himself said:

For the next few weeks we got twice as many requests for "Another One Rides the Bus" as for everything else put together. Thank goodness I had a tape rolling! We even got it in stereo. Over the next couple of months that tape was duplicated and re-duplicated all over the world, as the song took on a life of its own. [...] The Dr. Demento Show gained a couple of dozen new station affiliates just because of that song.

Eventually, Yankovic borrowed some money from Dr. Demento and pressed one thousand copies of a four-track EP by himself. Yankovic then distributed this EP to various record stores, selling them through consignment deals. Yankovic released the record under Placebo Records, a one-off label founded by Yankovic for the sole purpose of distributing the EPs. Due to the underground success of the EP, Yankovic secured a short-lived record deal with TK Records, which released "Another One Rides the Bus" as a single in February 1981. The record was rush-released, but nevertheless managed to become Yankovic's first Billboard entry, peaking at number four on the Bubbling Under Hot 100 singles chart. However, soon after issuing the "Another One Rides the Bus" single, TK abruptly closed due to financial troubles and the song fell off the charts.

Domestically, the single was released in a generic TK Records sleeve. International versions of the single, however, featured different artwork. The Dutch release, for instance, featured artwork depicting a crowded bus. According to Yankovic's official site, this version of the "single used artwork similar to what would appear on Al's first album."

Reception

The song was well received by music critics. In a later review of Yankovic's debut album, Eugene Chadbourne of AllMusic called the parody "a classic piece of musical humor" that showcased Yankovic's ability to knock "the wind out of any pretentious, overblown rock anthem by slightly adjusting the lyrical content." Nathan Rabin, in the book Weird Al, The Book (2012), praised the song, writing:

Though the modest Yankovic himself laughs off the notion, we can all agree that "Another One Rides the Bus" embodies the anarchic spirit of punk rock just as much as anything Johnny Rotten or The Clash ever recorded. It's the essence of punk: an enraged, defiant malcontent with a long list of grievances screaming his pain to an indifferent world. [...] Yankovic came to symbolize a curiously ubiquitous fixture of new wave: the enraged geek.

Brian May, the guitarist of Queen, found the song amusing, and said in an interview, "There's been a few cover versions [of 'Another One Bites the Dust'] of various kinds, notably 'Another One Rides the Bus', which is an extremely funny record by a bloke called 'Mad Al' or something in the [United] States—it's hilarious."

Live video

Although no official music video was created for this single, Yankovic and Schwartz performed "Another One Rides the Bus" on The Tomorrow Show with Tom Snyder. During the performance, Yankovic played his accordion and Schwartz banged on Yankovic's accordion case and played bulb horns. The Tomorrow Show performance was later included on the "Weird Al" Yankovic: The Ultimate Video Collection (2003) DVD as a bonus feature.

Use in other media

"Another One Rides the Bus" was used in The Walking Dead season eight opener "Mercy" during an ambiguous scene featuring a gray-haired and bearded Rick Grimes joining his family, including young daughter Judith. Many critics and commentators noted that the use of "Another One Rides the Bus" was idiosyncratic. Yankovic later tweeted: "I’m just as confused as you are why 'Another One Rides the Bus' was featured in #TheWalkingDead season premiere, but I’m extremely honored!" Showrunner Scott M. Gimple later told Entertainment Weekly that he had chosen the track because it "had to be a song that I wanted Judith to be into". Gimble also claimed that he wanted the music to be "even more jarring" than Rick's appearance.

Yankovic's 2022 comedy biographical film Weird: the Al Yankovic Story satirically claims that "Another One Rides the Bus" was created by Yankovic on the spot from a dare posed to him by Queen's Deacon and Wolfman Jack.

Track listing

 "Another One Rides the Bus" – 2:36
 "Gotta Boogie" – 2:21

Personnel
"Weird Al" Yankovic – lead vocals, accordion
Jon "Bermuda" Schwartz – accordion case percussion
Damaskas – backing vocals
Music Mike Kieffer & Sulu – musical hands
Beefalo Bill, Thom & Jeri – misc. insanities

Chart positions

Rerecording
In 2022, for the film Weird: The Al Yankovic Story, Yankovic re-recorded the track as well as four others. In the film, Yankovic (Daniel Radcliffe) is challenged by Wolfman Jack (Jack Black) and John Deacon (David Dastmalchian) to come up with a parody of "Another One Bites the Dust" on the spot, and Yankovic picks up an accordion and comes up with the song on the spot.

See also
List of singles by "Weird Al" Yankovic
List of songs by "Weird Al" Yankovic

Notes

References

Footnotes

Bibliography

"Weird Al" Yankovic songs
1981 singles
Queen (band)
Songs with lyrics by "Weird Al" Yankovic
Songs about buses
1980 songs
Songs written by John Deacon
TK Records singles

pt:"Weird Al" Yankovic (álbum)#Another One Rides the Bus (EP)